Marie Elisabeth Veys (born 1 May 1981) is a Belgian judoka.

Achievements

External links
 

1981 births
Living people
Belgian female judoka